Lieutenant-General Félix Maximilien Eugène Wielemans (10 January 1863 – 5 January 1917) was the Chief of Staff of the Belgian Army during the First World War.

After serving as the Chief of the Military Cabinet to the War Office under Charles de Broqueville in the run-up to the War, he took up the post of Deputy Chief of the General Staff in 1914, and was promoted to Chief of the General Staff in 1915. He represented Belgium at the Allied War Council in December 1915, and the Paris Conference in March 1916.

He received a large number of decorations for his role in the war, including the personal presentation of the Legion d'Honneur by General Joffre.

He died suddenly in January 1917, at Houtem; the cause of his death was reported by The New York Times as pneumonia contracted whilst in the trenches.

References
Obituary: p. 153, The Annual Register: a review of public events at home and abroad, for the year 1917. London: Longmans, Green and Co. 1918.
Death notice: p. 2, The New York Times, 7 January 1917.
Wielemans, on ars-moriendi.be 

1863 births
1917 deaths
Belgian generals
Belgian military personnel killed in World War I
Honorary Knights Grand Cross of the Order of the Bath
Commandeurs of the Légion d'honneur
Commanders of the Order of the Crown (Belgium)
Belgian Army generals of World War I
Deaths from pneumonia in Belgium
Military personnel from Ghent